Jerry W. Mitchell is an American investigative reporter formerly with The Clarion-Ledger, a newspaper in Jackson, Mississippi. He convinced authorities to reopen cold murder cases from the civil rights era, prompting one colleague to call him "the South's Simon Wiesenthal". In 2009, he received a "genius grant" from the MacArthur Foundation.

Life

Mitchell was a court reporter for the Clarion-Ledger in 1989 when the film Mississippi Burning inspired him to look into old civil rights cases that many thought had long since turned cold. His investigations have led to the arrest of several Klansmen and prompted authorities to reexamine numerous killings during the civil rights era.

In 1996, he was portrayed by Jerry Levine in the Rob Reiner film, Ghosts of Mississippi, about the murder of Medgar Evers and the belated effort to bring killer Byron De La Beckwith to justice. He was featured in The Learning Channel documentary Civil Rights Martyrs that aired in February 2000 and was a consultant for the Discovery Channel documentary Killed by the Klan which aired in 1999.

Mitchell received his undergraduate degree in communications from Harding University and his master's in journalism from Ohio State University in 1997, where he attended the Kiplinger Reporting Program. He lives in Jackson, Mississippi with his cat, Eudora.

Investigations 

Mitchell's reporting has helped to put at least four Klansmen behind bars: Byron De La Beckwith for the 1963 assassination of NAACP leader Medgar Evers, Imperial Wizard Sam Bowers for ordering the fatal firebombing of NAACP leader Vernon Dahmer in 1966, Bobby Cherry for the 1963 bombing of a Birmingham church that killed four girls and in 2005, Edgar Ray Killen, for helping orchestrate the June 21, 1964, killings of Michael Schwerner, James Chaney and Andrew Goodman. Killen died in prison in 2018 at almost 93 years old.

Mitchell's work inspired others. Since 1989, authorities in Mississippi and six other states have reexamined 29 killings from the civil rights era and made 27 arrests, leading to 22 convictions.  Since 2002, he has collaborated with award winning schoolteacher Barry Bradford, from Adlai E. Stevenson High School in Lincolnshire, Illinois, on several of his projects and has often written about the work of Bradford and his students, who helped Mitchell in the Mississippi Burning Case and, more recently, in clearing the name of Clyde Kennard.

One of Mitchell's most historic discoveries was the long secret identity of Mr. X, the secret informant who helped the FBI discover the location of the bodies of Chaney, Schwerner and Goodman. Mitchell had narrowed the list of possible candidates through exhaustive investigation. When Barry Bradford provided key information gleaned from his interview with retired FBI agent Don Casare, Mitchell was able to conclude that Highway Patrolman Maynard King was "Mr. X."

Mitchell, who joined the Clarion-Ledger in 1986, has been profiled by Nightline, USA Today, the New York Times, American Journalism Review and others. He has regularly appeared as an expert on CNN, the Lehrer News Hour and other programs.

In 2018, Mitchell retired from the Clarion Ledger and founded the Mississippi Center for investigative Reporting.

Awards 

For his investigative work, Mitchell has won more than 20 national awards, including a MacArthur Foundation genius grant and the Sigma Delta Chi Award for Public Service.  Mitchell has also received the Heywood Broun Award, the Sidney Hillman Award, the American Legion's Fourth Estate Award, the National Association of Black Journalists' Award for Enterprise Reporting, the Abraham Lincoln Marovitz Award and the Inland Press Association Award. The Southeastern chapter of the American Board of Trial Advocates decided in April 2006 to give Mitchell its first-ever award for Journalist of the Year.

In October 1998, Mitchell was recognized along with three other journalists at the Kennedy Center in Washington. In 1999, Gannett honored him with the Outstanding Achievement by an Individual Award, the Best Investigative Reporting Award, the Best In-Depth Reporting Award and its highest honor - the William Ringle Outstanding Achievement Career Award - making him the youngest recipient ever of the award. Two years later, he received the Best Beat Reporting Award from Gannett for his continued work to shine light on these dark crimes of the past, and in 2002, Gannett honored Mitchell as one of its top 10 journalists in the company over the past quarter century.

Peers have recognized Mitchell's work. In 2000, he received the Silver Em Award from the University of Mississippi, where he was called "a true hero of contemporary American journalism." In 2002, editors Judith and William Serrin featured his work in their anthology of the nation's best journalism over the past three centuries, Muckraking! The Journalism That Changed America.

In November 2005, Mitchell became the youngest recipient ever of Columbia University's John Chancellor Award for Excellence in Journalism for his 17 years of pursuing justice.

In 2006, Mitchell was named a Pulitzer Prize finalist, the winner of the George Polk Award for Justice Reporting, the winner of the Vernon Jarrett Award for Investigative Reporting, the Tom Renner Award for Crime Reporting from Investigative Reporters and Editors, and the Outstanding Achievement by an Individual Award (for the second time).  Later in 2006, Mitchell won the Toni House Journalism Award from the American Judicature Society.

In 2009, Mitchell received the inaugural McGill Medal for Journalistic Courage from the Grady College of Journalism and Mass Communication.

Mitchell was awarded an honorary doctorate degree from Colby College when he was the Elijah Parish Lovejoy Journalism Award, given by Colby College to a journalist who displayed the fearlessness Lovejoy did in decrying slavery in editorials in Missouri and Illinois, only to become the nation's first martyr to freedom of the press in 1837. In 2020 he was awarded an honorary doctorate degree from his undergraduate alma mater, Harding University.

Narratives 

Mitchell wrote a 10-chapter narrative, Genetic Disaster, describing his family's often losing battle against a rare genetic ailment and his journey to find out if he had the deadly disease. He received the Associated Press' Outstanding Writing Award for his 13-chapter narrative, The Preacher and the Klansman, which also received a Columbia Journalism School Citation for Coverage of Race & Ethnicity. Thousands have been touched by this story of how a preacher turned civil rights activist became friends with a former Ku Klux Klan terrorist, a true story of reconciliation. One reader wrote: "What a wonderful series, not only because of the heroic reporting and beautiful writing, but because it is at its core, the embodiment of hope."

In February 2020, Simon and Schuster released Mitchell's memoir Race Against Time.

Speaker 

In 2003, Mitchell was a featured speaker at the Ford Foundation's conference in New York City on "Journalism and Justice." In June 2005, he served as the commencement speaker for more than 10,000 graduates at Queens College, where Andy Goodman once attended. And in October 2005, he spoke at the dedication of the National Civil Rights Memorial Center in Montgomery, Alabama - an event attended by thousands. He regularly speaks at universities across the United States, from Santa Monica to Syracuse University. In 2021, Mitchell attended the Mississippi Scholastic Press Association at the University of Southern Mississippi as a keynote speaker for the Pamela D. Hamilton Keynote Address. Mitchell spoke on the topic of the power of the press.

References

External links
Columbia University bio of Mitchell 
The Moth podcast episode with Mitchell 

Place of birth missing (living people)
Year of birth missing (living people)
Living people
American members of the Churches of Christ
Elijah Parish Lovejoy Award recipients
Harding University alumni
Ohio State University School of Communication alumni
MacArthur Fellows